The 1919 Newfoundland general election was held on 3 November 1919 to elect members of the 24th General Assembly of Newfoundland in the Dominion of Newfoundland. The Liberal Reform Party, an alliance between the Liberals led by Richard Squires and the Fishermen's Protective Union of William Coaker, formed the government. The People's Party, became the Liberal-Labour-Progressive party following the election and formed the opposition. Squires served as Newfoundland prime minister.

Seat totals

Elected members
 Bay de Verde
 F. P. LeGrow Liberal Reform
 William H. Cave Liberal Reform
 Bonavista Bay
 William F. Coaker Liberal Reform (FPU)
 John Abbott Liberal Reform (FPU)
 Robert G. Winsor Liberal Reform (FPU)
 Burgeo-LaPoile
 Harvey Small Liberal Reform
 Burin
 John T. Cheeseman Liberal Reform
 Samuel J. Foote Liberal Reform
 Carbonear
 W. F. Penney Liberal Reform (speaker from 1920)
 Ferryland
 Michael P. Cashin Liberal-Progressive
 Phillip F. Moore Liberal-Progressive
 Fogo
 Richard Hibbs Liberal Reform (FPU)
 Fortune Bay
 William R. Warren Liberal Reform
 Harbour Grace
 G. A. Gosse Liberal Reform
 Arthur Barnes Liberal Reform
 Frank C. Archibald Liberal Reform
 Harbour Main
 W. E. Jones Liberal-Progressive
 William J. Woodford Liberal-Progressive
 Placentia and St. Mary's
 William J. Walsh Liberal-Progressive
 Michael S. Sullivan Liberal-Progressive
 E. Sinnott Liberal-Progressive
 Port de Grave
 John C. Crosbie Liberal-Progressive
 St. Barbe
 J. H. Scammell Liberal Reform (FPU)
 St. George's
 James MacDonnell Liberal Reform
 St. John's East
 William J. Higgins Liberal-Progressive (speaker)
 Cyril J. Fox Liberal-Progressive
 N. J. Vinnicombe Liberal-Progressive
 St. John's West
 Richard A. Squires Liberal Reform
 Henry J. Brownrigg Liberal Reform
 John R. Bennett Liberal-Progressive
 Trinity Bay
 William W. Halfyard Liberal Reform (FPU)
 John Guppy Liberal Reform (FPU)
 Archibald Targett Liberal Reform (FPU)
 Twillingate
 Walter Jennings Liberal Reform (FPU)
 George Jones Liberal Reform (FPU)
 Solomon Samson Liberal Reform (FPU)

References 
 
 

1919
1919 elections in North America
1919 elections in Canada
Politics of the Dominion of Newfoundland
1919 in Newfoundland
November 1919 events